Hobbseus prominens, the Prominence Riverlet Crayfish, is a species of crayfish in the family Cambaridae found in Mississippi and Alabama.

References

External links

Cambaridae
Freshwater crustaceans of North America
Crustaceans described in 1966
Taxa named by Horton H. Hobbs Jr.